Green Tour EP was a tour-only EP release by The Album Leaf, available at the band's live shows since 2007. In addition to its six tracks, it also contains a video for "We Need Help" shot on tour.

Track listing
We Need Help
Fear of Flying
Drawing Mountains
Enchanted Hill
Kevlar
San Simeon

References

2007 EPs
The Album Leaf albums